JianHao Tan (Chinese: 陈建豪; pinyin: Chén Jiànháo; born 14 June 1993) is a Singaporean YouTuber and the chief executive officer of Titan Digital Media. As of 17 March 2022, he has more than 6,020,000 subscribers on YouTube and 659,000 followers on Instagram.

Early life and education 
Tan was born on 14 June 1993 in Singapore. His mother, Luwina, a piano teacher, was born and raised in Hong Kong. At 8 years old, his father, Edmund, was posted to Cambodia by the Ministry of Foreign Affairs, and Tan moved there with his family. Several years later, his family moved to Hanoi, Vietnam, where he studied at the United Nations International School of Hanoi, graduating in 2011.

Career 
Tan started his YouTube channel in 2010 with two friends as a hobby, and also for a school project. He then served two years of National Service from when he was 18. Thereafter, Tan decided to make YouTube his full time career instead of pursuing further education in a university. He was mentored by Ryan Tan of Night Owl Cinematics sometime in 2014, and had more than 250,000 YouTube subscribers by December 2014.

Production company

A  job to promote an application in his channel in 2014 allowed him to make his first hire, and then subsequently founded The JianHao Tan Co, a production studio. In 2015, he was listed under the United States business magazine Forbes’ 30 Under 30 list.

In 2018, Tan rebranded The JianHao Tan production studio into Titan Digital Media. Tan started the T1T5 web series, a precursor to the Titan Academy, a series of short comedic situational skits and roleplaying videos, in collaboration with other multiple YouTube personalities. Additionally, he started co-hosting the Playtime TV YouTube channel with a seven-year-old Cindy, targeting the children audience.

In 2019, Tan's wedding proposal video was YouTube's most watched creators video in Singapore. In the same year, Tan launched a crowdfunding campaign to fund S$500,000 for a future movie set in the Titan Academy universe. The campaign received negative feedback from the public as it was deemed as targeting a non-financially independent target audience. Tan terminated the campaign and stated that the movie would be funded by himself.

As of 10 July 2022, Tan had around 5.56 million YouTube subscribers.

Personal life 

Tan married Debbie Soon Rui Yi on 21 May 2019, after a three-year relationship. They have a daughter named Starley, who was born on 19 September 2019.

Tan created The JianHao Tan Foundation in 2015. By 2019, the foundation had donated over $5,000 worth of food and toys to Thuy An Village, Vietnam.

Filmography

References 

1993 births
Living people
Singaporean YouTubers
Singaporean people of Chinese descent